Klaus Zillich (born 1942) is a German architect, landscape architect, urban planner and professor emeritus.

Life
Klaus Zillich studied architecture in Hanover from 1960 to 1965 and then with Candilis-Josic-Woods in Paris. At the end of the 1960s he completed his studies at the Technical University of Berlin with Oswald Mathias Ungers.

With his office partner Jasper Halfmann and later Wolfgang Engel, Zillich created buildings of various scales - from kindergartens to large housing developments in the south of Berlin. Your work came about a. in the context of the Berlin urban renewal discourse, partly also the International Building Exhibition 1987. The buildings are often characterized by strong expressiveness and are always to be read as an answer to the specific context of a place. In many buildings, climatic and ecological considerations also shape the design.

At the TU Berlin he headed the department of design, urban district planning and urban renewal.

Buildings
Open space planning: residential complex Ritterstraße-Nord, Alte Jakobstraße / Feilnerstraße / Lindenstraße / Oranienstraße / Ritterstraße, 1983, with Jasper Halfmann
Cosmological Park, Britzer Garten Berlin, 1985, with Jasper Halfmann and Jürgen Zilling
Day care center, Lindauer Allee, Berlin, 1989
Stresemann Mews, Block 19, Wilhelmstrasse 131 / 136–139, Stresemannstrasse 38 / 42–46, 1990, with Jasper Halfmann
Day care center in the Stadthausquartier, Lützowstraße 40–42, 1992, with Jasper Halfmann
Park settlement Spruch, Berlin-Neukölln, 1996, with Jasper Halfmann

Publications
Jasper Halfmann, Clod Zillich: Projects 76–82. Aedes Gallery for Architecture and Space, Berlin 1982.
Jasper Halfmann, Klaus Zillich: Daycare Center Lützowstrasse, Berlin Tiergarten. Aedes Gallery for Architecture and Space, Berlin 1993.

Literature
Lukas Fink, Tobias Fink, Ruben Bernegger: Berlin portraits - narratives on the architecture of the city . Verlag der Buchhandlung Walther König, Cologne 2019. 
Jasper Halfmann, Klaus Zillich, Coop Himmelblau, Hinrich Baller, Inken Baller, Peter Cook : Die Aufmüpfigen. AA Files No. 9, pp. 65–82, Architectural Association School of Architecture, London 1985
K. Zillich, J. Halfmann, H. Kollhoff, B. Tonon, PL Wilson, B. Podrecca, JL Mateo, F. Neumeyer, M. Meili, F. Venezia: Berlin Summer Academy of Architecture, Bundesallee projects, A + U, Edition: 11/1988, 218, pp. 31–74

References

20th-century German architects
German landscape architects
German urban planners
1942 births
Living people
Academic staff of the Technical University of Berlin